Curtis Anderson may refer to:
 Curtis Anderson (American football, born 1957), American football defensive end
 Curtis Anderson (American football, born 1973), American football cornerback
 Curtis Anderson (footballer), English footballer